Hugo Yue-Ho Yon is an American diplomat who is the nominee to serve as the U.S ambassador to the Maldives.

Early life and education
Yon earned a bachelor's degree from the University of California at Berkeley and a Master of Public Affairs degree from the Princeton School of Public and International Affairs.

Career
Yon is a career member of the Senior Foreign Service, with the rank of Minister-Counselor. He currently serves as a senior advisor in the Office of the Under Secretary of State for Economic Growth, Energy, and the Environment within the U.S. Department of State in Washington, D.C. Yon also served as the Acting Principal Deputy Assistant Secretary in the State Department's Bureau of International Organization Affairs, and before this assignment, he served as the Deputy Assistant Secretary for Transportation Affairs within the Bureau of Economic and Business Affairs. Yon also served as the Director for International Economics and Finance, and as Director for India and the Subcontinent, both at the White House National Security Council. Overseas assignments include serving as the Deputy Minister Counselor for Economic Affairs at the  U.S. Embassy in New Delhi, India; Deputy Economic Counselor of the U.S. Embassy in Jakarta, Indonesia; and as Deputy Financial Attaché at the U.S. Embassy in Beijing, China.

Ambassador to the Maldives
On July 27, 2022, President Joe Biden announced his intent to nominate Yon to be the next ambassador to the Maldives. On July 28, 2022, his nomination was sent to the United States Senate. His nomination was not acted upon for the rest of the year and was returned to President Biden on January 3, 2023.

President Biden renominated Yon the same day. His nomination is pending before the Senate Foreign Relations Committee.

Personal life
Yon speaks Cantonese, Mandarin Chinese, and Indonesian.

References

Living people
University of California, Berkeley alumni
Princeton School of Public and International Affairs alumni
United States Foreign Service personnel
American diplomats
Year of birth missing (living people)